Petr Hapka (13 May 1944 – 25 November 2014) was a Czech composer, one of the most significant composers of Czech film music scores. He is known for his collaborations with the lyricist Michal Horáček.

Discography
Studio albums
1987: Potměšilý host with Hana Hegerová & Michal Horáček
1988: V penziónu Svět with Michal Horáček
1996: Citová investice with Michal Horáček
2001: Mohlo by tu být i líp with Michal Horáček
2006: Strážce plamene with Michal Horáček
2009: Kudykam with Michal Horáček
2011: Tante Cose da Veder with Michal Horáček & Ondřej Brzobohatý

Film score (selected)
1973: Akce Bororo
1976: Den pro mou lásku
1976: Léto s kovbojem
1977: Ružové sny
1978: Panna a netvor
1979: Deváté srdce
1981: Upír z Feratu
1983: Tisícročná včela
1984: Fešák Hubert
1985: Perinbaba
1987: Copak je to za vojáka...
1989: Vážení přátelé, ano
1995: Bylo nás pět
1999: Hanele
2002: Fimfárum Jana Wericha

Awards

References

External links 

 
 
 Petr Hapka on Cinemania

 Petr Hapka on Discogs
 Petr Hapka by Google Images
 

1944 births
2014 deaths
Czech film score composers
Male film score composers
Czechoslovak male singers
Musicians from Prague
Czech male composers